Susan Wehle (May 14, 1953 – February 12, 2009) was ordained the first American female Jewish Renewal cantor (hazzan) in 2006. Wehle was a cantor for Temple Beth Am in Williamsville, New York, and Temple Sinai in Amherst, New York, for nine years. She created one CD, Songs of Healing and Hope. She was the daughter of Holocaust survivors Hana and Kurt Wehle, and had two sons, Jonah and Jake. She died in the plane crash of Colgan Air Flight 3407 in Clarence, New York.

References

1953 births
2009 deaths
Women hazzans
20th-century American Jews
Victims of aviation accidents or incidents in the United States
Accidental deaths in New York (state)
21st-century American women singers
21st-century American singers
20th-century American women